The DKW F7 is a front-wheel-drive small family car launched by Auto Union’s DKW division in 1937 as a replacement for the DKW F5.

The body 
Changes between the F5 and the F7 were mostly at a detailed level. However, the entry level Reichsklasse saloon now shared the (hitherto slightly longer) body of the Meisterklasse saloon.

In addition to the 2-door saloon, a 2-door cabriolet saloon was also available. In 1938 a 2-door coupe cabriolet, the Front Luxus Cabriolet, was added to the range.

Engine and running gear 
The car has the two cylinder two stroke engine of its predecessor.

Like all the small DKWs of the 1930s, the F7 featured front wheel drive, which at this stage was unusual, and which in the light of subsequent developments can be seen as prescient.

Commercial 
The popular F7 was replaced by the DKW F8 in 1939.   By this time, approximately 80,000 F7s had been built.

Sources 

F89
Compact cars
Sedans
Convertibles
Front-wheel-drive vehicles
1930s cars
Cars introduced in 1937